Parliamentary elections were held in Portugal on 12 December 1905. The result was a victory for the Progressive Party, which won 109 seats.

Results

The results exclude seats from overseas territories.

References

Legislative elections in Portugal
Portugal
1905 elections in Portugal
December 1905 events